Remembering Bud: Cleopatra's Dream is a jazz trio album recorded by pianist Toshiko Akiyoshi in 1990 as a tribute to jazz pianist Bud Powell and released on the Nippon Crown record label in Japan and on the Evidence label in the USA.

Track listing
all compositions by Bud Powell except as noted:
"Cleopatra's Dream" – 6:29
"Remembering Bud" (Akiyoshi) – 9:27
"Un Poco Loco" – 6:10
"Oblivion" – 4:56
"Celia" – 6:43
"I'll Keep Loving You" –6:08
"Parisian Thoroughfare" – 4:55
"Budo" (Davis, Powell) – 3:59
"Tempus Fugit" – 4:12
"Dance of the Infidels" – 3:35

Personnel
Toshiko Akiyoshi – piano
George Mraz – bass  (Tracks 2~7, 10)
Ray Drummond – bass (Tracks 1, 8, 9)
Lewis Nash – drums
Al Harewood – drums

References / External Links
Nippon Crown PAS 1007, Nippon Crown CRCJ-91003
Evidence 22034
[ All Music Guide]

Specific

Toshiko Akiyoshi albums
1990 albums
Albums recorded at Van Gelder Studio